Lake Township is a township in Muscatine County, Iowa, United States.

History
Lake Township was organized on July 2, 1859.

References

Townships in Muscatine County, Iowa
Townships in Iowa
1859 establishments in Iowa